Mitch Seabaugh (born March 18, 1960) is an American politician who served in the Georgia State Senate from the 28th district from 2001 to 2011.

References

1960 births
Living people
Republican Party Georgia (U.S. state) state senators